Thor Lunde (19 November 1924 – 27 November 2002) was a Norwegian footballer. He played in one match for the Norway national football team in 1948.

References

External links
 

1924 births
2002 deaths
Norwegian footballers
Norway international footballers
Place of birth missing
Association footballers not categorized by position